The 1923 St. Louis All-Stars season was their sole season in the league. The team finished 1–4–2 in league play, and a 2–5–2 overall record finishing fourteenth in the standings.

Schedule

Standings

References

St. Louis All-Stars seasons
St. Louis All-Stars